The Boston Philharmonic Orchestra (not to be confused with the Boston Symphony Orchestra) is a semi-professional orchestra based in Boston, Massachusetts, United States. It was founded in 1979.

Their concerts take place at New England Conservatory's Jordan Hall and at Harvard University's Sanders Theatre. The orchestra has been conducted by Benjamin Zander since it was founded in 1979.  Each concert is preceded by a talk which explains the musical ideas and structure of the pieces about to be performed.

References

External links 
 

Musical groups from Boston
Musical groups established in 1979
Orchestras based in Massachusetts
1979 establishments in Massachusetts